The 1999 New Mexico Lobos football team was an American football team that represented the University of New Mexico in the Western Athletic Conference (WAC) during the 1999 NCAA Division I-A football season.  In their second season under head coach Rocky Long, the Lobos compiled a 4–7 record (3–4 against WAC opponents) and were outscored by a total of 298 to 240. 

The team's statistical leaders included Sean Stein with 1,584 passing yards, Holmon Wiggins with 601 rushing yards, Martinez Williams with 609 receiving yards, and kicker David McKinney with 42 points scored.

Schedule

Roster

References

New Mexico
New Mexico Lobos football seasons
New Mexico Lobos football